Edward Tennyson Conolly (31 August 1822 – 8 November 1908) was a New Zealand lawyer, politician and judge.

Conolly was born in Chichester, Sussex, England, on 31 August 1822, and was the son of noted physician John Conolly.

He was the Minister of Justice 1882–1884 and Attorney-General 1883–1884.

Notes

References

External links
 

|-

|-

1822 births
1908 deaths
Members of the Cabinet of New Zealand
New Zealand MPs for South Island electorates
19th-century New Zealand lawyers
District Court of New Zealand judges
English emigrants to New Zealand
People from Chichester
Members of the New Zealand House of Representatives
People from Picton, New Zealand
Colony of New Zealand judges
19th-century New Zealand politicians
Attorneys-General of the Colony of New Zealand
Justice ministers of New Zealand